Pine Mountain Club is an unincorporated area and census-designated place in southwestern Kern County, California. As of the 2010 census it had a population of 2,315.

It is one of the Mountain Communities of the Tejon Pass.

Geography
The community sits in a deep valley of the San Emigdio Mountains, on the San Andreas fault. It is surrounded by Los Padres National Forest. The settlement lies between Apache Saddle and Pinon Pines Estates along Mil Potrero Highway. It is west of Frazier Park, Lebec, and Interstate 5.

History

Founding and development

Pine Mountain Club was developed in 1971 by Tenneco. The first announcement was made from Houston, Texas, in April of that year when the company said it would develop "more than 1.1 million acres of land in Arizona and Southern California."<ref name=TennecoTells>Associated Press, "Tenneco Tells Plans for Major Land Developments," Santa Cruz Sentinel, April 14, 1971, image 14]</ref> Tenneco was the Bakersfield-based western land-development arm of Tenneco, Inc., of Houston.

About half that acreage was to be in Kern County, where the projects would include the residential development of 6,500 acres surrounding the then-new California State College near Bakersfield and 3,200 acres in the Los Padres National Forest, also mostly for residences (Pine Mountain Club).

The forest project was to set aside a thousand acres for vacation home sites and 2,200 acres "for permanent preservation in their natural state." The program was to be directed by John E. Sommerhalder, president of Tenneco West. The land was part of a 3,200-acre tract of pine forest and meadowland, formerly a private preserve.

Tenneco West was a Bakersfield subsidiary that administered all the western holdings of Tenneco, "the parent, Houston-based, multi-industry company."

Adjacent to the clubhouse will be a nine-hole executive golf course[,] and other recreational facilities are a heated swimming pool, archery range, volleyball and basketball courts, a lake stocked with fish and a community barbecue area.

Tenneco West President Sommerhalder said the club was believed to be among the largest all-electric family recreational resorts in California. Three kinds of "vacation or weekend homesites" were to be offered: (1) One- to three-bedroom dwellings, (2) modular homes, and (3) space for mobile homes.

Hiking trails, bridle trails (16 miles marked for from one-hour to all-day rides), an equestrian center with 10-stall barn, tack room, riding ring and corrals for boarding horses also will be available. . . . Later this year, a general store and laundromat will be added.

The prices were estimated to begin from about $13,500 for a one-bedroom house and lot.

At the time of the announcement in 1971, "four deep wells" had already been sunk and an "extensive network of reservoirs and pipelines" laid, with a filtration plant near the commercial center.
 
Sommerhalder said the developer had the "assistance of Simon Eisner, nationally known environmental planner."

Eight months after the opening, seventy-nine percent of the 1,309 purchasers indicated in a survey that construction of a vacation home was the prime reason for buying a lot and 43% of that group said they intended to start building during 1972.

The development's sixth and final section, on a plateau some thousand feet higher than the clubhouse, went on sale in March 1973.

Mil Potrero Highway

Tenneco West improved a "winding, steep, one-lane dirt road" called Mil Potrero west from Pine Mountain Club to California State Highway 33 into a "comfortable, convenient and safe way . . . to view what is generally regarded as Southern California's most strikingly beautiful scene." The cost for the 6.5-mile segment was estimated at nearly a million dollars. John E. Sommerhalder, the company president, said the road opened up "a large segment of the [Los Padres National] forest that, until now, has been almost inaccessible."

The job was unusually difficult, partly because of the mountainous terrain and partly because of protective and restorative measures taken to reduce to a minimum the disturbance to the natural surroundings. . . . The project had to conform to the specifications and requirements of both Kern County and the U.S. Forest Service. In effect, it is already a public road, although Tenneco must maintain it for a year before the formal dedication as a public road can take place.

To keep damages to the forest at a minimum, contractors Yeager Construction of Riverside and Desert Construction of Victorville were required to do all the work from the existing right-of-way and forbidden to build a temporary construction road alongside. Fire-protection equipment had to be on hand at all times.

Fruition

By 1988, Pine Mountain Club had a small commercial district with about forty businesses, ranging from a Mobil gas station to a place called "Pheasants by Frank." According to the Newhall Signal, the district was "more or less shut down on Mondays and Tuesdays . . . because there are so many people with weekend homes that the stores choose to stay open Saturday and Sunday."

On July 31, 2021, the community celebrated its fiftieth birthday with a barbecue picnic on blankets spread beneath the trees next to the golf course. Also noted was the 50th anniversary of the founding of the Mil Potrero Mutual Water Company.

Demographics

2010 census
The 2010 United States Census reported that Pine Mountain Club had a population of 2,315. The racial makeup was 2,079 (89.8%) white, 29 (1.3%) African American, 25 (1.1%) Native American, 45 (1.9%) Asian, 0 (0.0%) Pacific Islander, 58 (2.5%) from other races, and 79 (3.4%) from two or more races. Hispanic or Latino of any race were 231 persons (10.0%).

There were 1,062 households, of which 226 (21.3%) had children under the age of 18 living in them, 585 (55.1%) were opposite-sex married couples living together, 62 (5.8%) had a female householder with no husband present, and 36 (3.4%) had a male householder with no wife present.  There were 49 (4.6%) unmarried opposite-sex partnerships, and 13 (1.2%) same-sex married couples or partnerships. Three hundred eighteen households (29.9%) were made up of individuals, and 111 (10.5%) had someone living alone who was 65 years of age or older. The average household size was 2.18.  There were 683 families (64.3% of all households); the average family size was 2.68 persons.

Four hundred eleven people (17.8%) were under the age of 18, 105 were (4.5%) aged 18 to 24, 355 (15.3%) aged 25 to 44, 929 (40.1%) aged 45 to 64, and 515 (22.2%) 65 years or older.  The median age was 51.6 years. For every 100 females, there were 102.9 males.  For every 100 women age 18 and over, there were 103.2 men.

The homeowner vacancy rate was 6.1%; the rental vacancy rate was 17.8%. Exactly 1,884 people (81.4% of the population) lived in owner-occupied housing units and 431 (18.6%) in rentals.

2000 census
The 2000 census found that almost 91 percent of the sixteen hundred residents were  white. There were nine blacks. There were 146  Hispanics or Latinos of any race. Other residents included 19 American Indians or Alaska natives and 12 Asians.

It was a relatively aged population, the median age being 45 years compared with 35 years for the nation as a whole. PMC also had more veterans than its share — 263, or 21 percent, compared to 13 percent around the country. In contrast with the country at large, where 64 percent of the people were working, Pine Mountain Club had just 56 percent employed. Those who were working had to travel about an hour to their jobs, compared to 25 minutes for most Americans.

It was a high-income area — $62,750 median family income, compared to $50,046 in the nation at large. In per capita income, it stood at $25,465 — just between Diamond Bar and Mira Monte among other towns in California.

Yet there were still 55 families (or 15 percent) below the poverty level in Pine Mountain Club in 2000. That is greater than the 12 percent for the country as a whole.

Almost two-thirds of its 1,737 housing units (61.5 percent) were vacant when the census was taken in March 2000. Owners lived in about eight of every 10 occupied units (84 percent), renters in the other two (16 percent).

Community management

The association maintains several recreational facilities , including a nine-hole golf course, pool, clubhouse, and stables. It manages the Pine Mountain Patrol  and publishes a monthly newspaper, the Condor .

Education
Pine Mountain Club is part of the El Tejon Unified School District, and students are transported by bus to local public schools, including Frazier Mountain High School. The community hosts a charter school, Peak to Peak Mountain Charter, serving grades kindergarten through seventh. The private Mountain Community Christian School serves kindergarten through sixth-grade pupils.

Transportation
Kern Regional Transit provides bus service Thursdays and Saturdays during the summer to Frazier Park, Gorman, Lake of the Woods, Lebec,  and Pinon Pines. It offers a dial-a-ride service all year. Connections can be made in Frazier Park or Lebec to a scheduled service to Grapevine and Bakersfield and further connection there to Greyhound and Amtrak.

Commerce and economic development
The area is served by the Mountain Communities Chamber of Commerce.

Picture gallery

Pine Mountain Club is a private community.Click the images to see larger versions of the photos, all from 2008.

See also
The Mountain Enterprise newspaper, which circulates in Pine Mountain Club and the surrounding area.

External links

 "Pine Mountain Club Family Resort Opens," Valley News, Van Nuys, California, June 20, 1971

Media
The Mountain Enterprise
Bakersfield Californian The Californian'' discontinued circulation in the Mountain Communities effective May 1, 2009. [http://www.mountainenterprise.com/full.php?sid=4672 Source: Mountain Enterprise, April 3, 2009

References

External links
The Pine Mountain Club Property Owners Association

Mountain Communities of the Tejon Pass
Census-designated places in Kern County, California
San Emigdio Mountains
Unincorporated communities in Kern County, California
Unincorporated communities in California